Kristin L. Heaston (born November 23, 1975, in Walnut Creek, California) is a female  shot putter from the United States.

In 2003 Heaston became the American indoor and outdoor shot put champion. At the 2004 Olympic Games Heaston became the first woman ever to compete at the ancient site Olympia. In 2005, she became American outdoor shot put champion for the second time.

She finished thirteenth at the 2001 Summer Universiade and seventh at the 2006 World Athletics Final and the 2007 World Athletics Final.

International competitions

See also 

 Florida Gators
 List of University of Florida Olympians

External links 
 
 
 

Track and field athletes from California
Sportspeople from Walnut Creek, California
Sportspeople from the San Francisco Bay Area
American female shot putters
Olympic track and field athletes of the United States
Athletes (track and field) at the 2004 Summer Olympics
Athletes (track and field) at the 2008 Summer Olympics
Pan American Games track and field athletes for the United States
Athletes (track and field) at the 2003 Pan American Games
World Athletics Championships athletes for the United States
Florida Gators women's track and field athletes
1975 births
Living people